The 2003 Brantford municipal election was held on November 10, 2003, to elect a mayor, city councillors, and school trustees in the city of Brantford, Ontario.

Mike Hancock narrowly defeated incumbent Chris Friel in the mayoral contest, winning by only fifteen votes. Despite the close margin, Friel decided not to seek a recount.

Results

Randy Tooke was thirty-one years old during the election and owned a café in Brantford. He focused his campaign around a call for downtown revitalization to benefit small-business owners.

Wally Lucente was born and raised in Brantford. He first ran for the Brantford City Council in 1985 with support from the Brantford and District Labour Council; he was thirty years old at the time and worked for the provincial labour ministry. Defeated on that occasion, he was elected in 1988, 1991, 1994, 1997, and 2000. During his time on council, he chaired Brantford's police services board; waterfront advisory committee; Mohawk Lake committee; and engineering, public works and community services committee. In 2001, he raised the option of a combined municipal police force for Brantford and neighbouring Brant County. While he often had poor relations with his fellow ward councillor Marguerite Ceschi-Smith, he nonetheless supported her downtown brownfield rehabilitation program in 2002. When Lucente ran for re-election in 2003, he said that he wanted to see the Brantford Southern Access Road through to completion. During the 2003 election, local journalist Tim Philp described him as a "good councillor" who "carries out his duties but contributes little useful to council discussions." After his defeat, he continued working for the provincial labour ministry and chaired the Brant County Police Services Board as a citizen member.
Charles "Skip" Pennell is best known as a tourism supporter in Brantford. He was active with the Pine Tree Native Centre in the 1990s and early 2000s and was the project coordinator for Kanata, a replica seventeenth-century Iroquois village that opened in 2000. The village won an award for Best New Tourism Attraction in Ontario and was runner-up for Best New Attraction of Canada. Pennell has also chaired Brantford's tourism advisory board. He was fifty-one years old when he ran for council; he said that he respected incumbent councillors Marguerite Ceschi-Smith and Wally Lucente and was running to offer another voice.

Source: Vincent Ball, "Council table shake up: Four new faces elected by Brantford voters wanting change," Brantford Expositor, 11 November 2003, A3.

References

2003 Ontario municipal elections
2003